N43 may refer to:
 N43 (Long Island bus)
 BMW N43, an automobile engine
 Braden Airpark in Easton, Pennsylvania, United States
 Nebraska Highway 43, in the United States
 Nyungwe language, a Bantu language of Mozambique
 Umbugarla language, an extinct Australian Aboriginal language